Tomáš Vyoral (born 28 September 1992) is  a Czech basketball player for JIP Pardubice of the Czech Republic National Basketball League (NBL) and the Champions League. He also represents the Czech Republic national team.

Professional career
Vyoral started his career in 2009 at Basket Poděbrady where he averaged 5.4 points, 2.4 rebounds and 1.7 assists. He moved to USK Praha where he averaged 7.5 points, 2.2 rebounds and 1.2 assists. He signed with ERA Nymburk in 2011, during the 2011-12 season, Vyoral averaged 2.31 points, 1.1 rebounds and 0.75 assist in all competitions he participated in.

Vyoral moved to BC Kolín for the 2012-13 season, where he posted averages of 8.36 points, 1.32 rebounds and 0.79 assists. In the 2013-14 season, he moved to BK Děčín where he averaged 8.36 points, 3.02 rebounds and 3.38 assists. In the 2014-15 season, he averaged 11 points, 3.3 rebounds and 3.9 assists. In the 2015-16 season, he averaged 13.8 points, 3.9 rebounds and 4.3 assists.

For the 2016-17 season, Vyoral moved back to ERA Nymburk where he averaged 12.4 points, 2.7 rebounds and 3.3 assists. In the 2017-18 season, he averaged 8.2 points, 3.5 rebounds and 4.1 assists. During the 2018-19 season, he averaged 6.9 points, 2.7 rebounds and 3.9 assists. Vyoral signed with JIP Pardubice for the 2019-20 season.

National team career
Vyoral represented the Czech national team at the 2019 FIBA World Cup.

References

1992 births
Living people
2019 FIBA Basketball World Cup players
Basketball Nymburk players
Basketball players at the 2020 Summer Olympics
BC Kolín players
BK Děčín players
BK Pardubice players
Czech men's basketball players
Olympic basketball players of the Czech Republic
Point guards
USK Praha players